The following is a list of football stadiums in Malaysia, ranked in descending order of capacity. There are over 500 football stadiums (main/mini/sports complex) and pitches in Malaysia so this list is not comprehensive. The list below consisting the biggest football stadium and current owner or tenant, where FIFA or FAM authorized official football matches are allowed. The 12,000-capacity Malaysia National Hockey Stadium is the largest Malaysian stadium which is not used for football.

Currently most major and significant stadiums in Malaysia with a capacity of 1,000 or more were included as some of the stadium has been under utilised and not well maintained as others stadium due to lack of major clubs adopt as home ground. The list includes: 
 All 24 clubs in the top two tiers professional football league of the Malaysian football league system as of the 2018 season (Malaysia Super League and Malaysia Premier League).
 14 clubs in the third-tier semi-pro football league as of 2018 season (Malaysia M3 League).

Existing stadiums

Old stadiums
This is the list of stadium which has been demolished.
Stadium Kajang - The stadium has been redeveloped into a sports complex for multi-purpose sports activities. Its football pitch still exist for the used for community football match.

Future stadiums
This is the list of stadium currently under development for all-seater.
 Stadium Sultan Ibrahim Larkin - A new stadium under development for Johor Darul Ta'zim. Capacity 40,549

See also
List of Asian stadiums by capacity
List of association football stadiums by capacity

References

 
Malaysia
Football stadiums